, better known as , is a Japanese actor, singer-songwriter, musician, model and film director. He is a talent of Amuse, Inc.

Biography
Dean Fujioka was born in Sukagawa, Fukushima Prefecture, Japan. Moving with his family, he grew up in Kamagaya, Chiba Prefecture. Although Fujioka is multilingual (fluent in Japanese, English, Cantonese, Standard Mandarin, Indonesian) and made his debut in a Chinese fashion show, he has clarified in some interviews and variety shows that his parents and grandparents are all Japanese, who used to work or live in foreign countries. Raised in such a family, he grew determined to explore the world himself. After graduating from Chiba Prefectural Funabashi High School, Fujioka majored in IT at a community college in Seattle, USA. After graduating from college, he traveled to different countries in Asia and came into contact with various ethnicities, cultures and languages.

Fujioka has a wide range of hobbies such as Chinese martial arts, kickboxing, chess, basketball, skiing and taking pictures, and also likes composition and lyrics. Although he is allergic to gluten, he enjoys eating and is particular about food.

Since his childhood, Fujioka had been influenced by musical theory and instruments. He produced music, first in Indonesia, but now mainly in Tokyo. Besides writing, composing, and producing, he also works as a rap singer. He can play a number of instruments, such as the guitar, the drums, and the piano. Fujioka also often shows off his beatboxing skills on TV shows. He likes music such as songs by Yutaka Ozaki and the song "Sweet Memories" by Seiko Matsuda. The song "Kessen wa Kinyōbi" of Japanese band Dreams Come True is the first single CD he bought by himself.

Fujioka married Chinese Indonesian Vanina Amalia Hidayat in 2012; they had fraternal twins in 2014. In March 2017, Fujioka posted a picture of his third baby on Instagram.

Career

Active overseas
Dean Fujioka started his career as a model in Hong Kong's fashion scene in 2004 for both local and international designer brands. He continued to appear in Hong Kong's leading fashion and lifestyle magazines. Simultaneously with his career in fashion, he also embarked on various advertising campaigns, appearing in TV and print commercials for both local and multinational clients in the Asia pacific region.

In 2006, Fujioka started to pursue a career in acting. He moved his base from Hong Kong to Taipei and appeared in his first TV series Goku Dō High School with Bao Weimin, Bao Xiaobo, and Kingone Wang. His very first film August Story, starring Tian Yuan, Dean Fujioka, and Jan Cheung, caught public attention in the film festivals held in Hong Kong, Japan, and Taiwan.

In 2007, Fujioka appeared as a talented pianist in the TV series Corner with Love with Barbie Shu and Show Lo. He also appeared in Summer's Tail, his first film in Taiwan, with Bryant Chang, Enno Cheng, and Hannah Lin. A year later, Fujioka appeared in the TV series Miss No Good with Rainie Yang and Will Pan, produced by Angie Chai. Afterwards, he suspended his career in acting and went to Jakarta, where he met DJ Sumo (Sumantri) and collaborated on his songs.

In 2011, Fujioka appeared in the feature film Seediq Bale, about the history of Taiwan under Japanese rule, and in the film The Road Less Traveled with Vanness Wu, Jimmy Hung, Eric Tu, and Chris Lung. He also joined Amuse, Inc. in that year. In 2012, Fujioka appeared in the film Black & White Episode I: The Dawn of Assault, which was based on the popular Taiwanese TV series directed by Tsai Yueh-Hsun.

In 2013, Fujioka appeared in the TV series Just You in Taiwan. Furthermore, he starred in his first self-directed film I am Ichihashi: Journal of a Murderer in Japan. A year later, he appeared as a Chinese historical figure in his first Japanese TV movie Shooting Down – Three Pilots, the dramatization of the lives of three fighter pilots from Japan, China, and the U.S.A. He also appeared as a noble samurai-like Japanese in the TV series The Pinkertons in North America.

Getting his big break in Japan
In 2015, Fujioka starred as a private detective in his first Japanese TV series Detective versus Detectives. He also impressed with his appearance as a Japanese historical figure in the Japanese morning drama series Here Comes Asa!. In 2016, he not only appeared in the TV series Please Love the Useless Me and IQ246: The Cases of a Royal Genius but also starred in the web series Happy Marriage!? and the TV movie The Noisy Street, The Silent Sea, playing a variety of roles with distinctive personalities. Furthermore, Fujioka resumed his career in music and released his first album Cycle in March. He also started a regular segment in a radio program. In the same year, Fujioka released the download single "History Maker" which is used as the opening of the anime television series Yuri!!! on Ice. Along with global popularity of the anime, his name came to be known to people all over the world. According to the top trending Google Search queries by year in 2016, he was ranked 5th in the world in the category "Musicians".

In 2017, Fujioka started an irregular appearance as an influencer in a news program, Saturday Station. His song "Unchained Melody" is used as the ending of it and of Sunday Station. He starred as an unfaithful man in the film Marriage and released his first EP "Permanent Vacation" as its theme song. Fujioka also starred in the TV series May I blackmail you? with Emi Takei, and released his second EP "Let it snow!" as its theme song. He appeared in the TV series Moribito II: Guardian of the Spirit and Totto-chan!. Furthermore, he appeared in the live action adaptation of the anime and manga Fullmetal Alchemist. In this film, he played the colonel Roy Mustang, one of the most popular characters in the story.

In 2018, Fujioka held his first Japan tour entitled History In The Making 2018 and attracted 20,000 fans, including fans travelling to the concerts from overseas. He starred in the TV series The Count of Monte-Cristo: Great Revenge. His performance in this drama made Fujioka win the Best Leading Actor at the 12th Confidence Award Drama Prize. Furthermore, he released the single "Echo" as its theme song. The song is inspired by the "Wave" genre which attracted the attention in the worldwide club music scene. Its music video, in which he co-starred with Moga Mogami, received the Best Alternative Video at the MTV Video Music Awards Japan. 
Fujioka also appeared in the film Kids on the Slope and Recall and starred in the film The Man from the Sea, filmed in Jakarta.

In January 2019, Fujioka starred in the TV movie Les Misérables: Owarinaki Tabiji with Arata Iura. In the same month, he released his second album History In The Making. In February, he made his debut as a DJ at a club event presented by Taku Takahashi, among other stars such as starRo, TJO, and YUC'e. In March, he was nominated for the Best Supporting Actor of the 42nd Japan Academy Prize for his performance in the film Recall. From February to May, he held his first Asia tour, titled Born To Make History. The tour venues included Shanghai, Hong Kong, Taiwan and Indonesia. In September, he appeared as the Executive Secretary to the Prime Minister in the film Hit Me Anyone One More Time directed by Koki Mitani. Meanwhile, he took part in the festival 908 FESTIVAL 2019 presented by KREVA. From October onward, he starred in the Japanese TV series Sherlock: Untold Stories. He also sang its theme song "Shelly" and opening song "Searching For The Ghost". In November, in the omnibus film Angel Sign directed by manga artist Tsukasa Hojo, he co-starred with Nao Matsushita. He also sang its theme song. Meanwhile, by his remarks on a TV variety show, he collaborated with the sweets cafe "taiwan ten cafe" originated in Taiwan. He supervised drinks with tapioca named "Dean Tapioca" and put them on sale for a limited time. Around the same time, he presided over "Weibo Account Festival in Japan 2019" for the first time, and also received the Ambassador of Sino-Japanese Cultural Exchange. In December, he released his third EP "Shelly". This includes the song "Send It Away (feat. GONG)", which made him the first Japanese artist to be ranked in the charts 东方风云榜 (ERC Chinese Top Ten), also known as the Chinese version of Billboard. The song's highest ranking on the charts was No. 4.

In February 2020, Fujioka assumed the post of an ambassador of "World Robot Summit 2020". Meanwhile, he planned to hold his live tour from October 2020 to January 2021, but cancelled it due to the spread of COVID‑19. In August, he released the download single "Neo Dimension" on his birthday. There was a song "My Dimension" that he wrote in 2008 and first released in 2013 as his self-introduction and the statement of his intentions. He evolved it into a completely new form song after 12 years. In September, he released the download single "东京游 (Tokyo Trip)". On this song, he collaborated with 福克斯 (FOX) which is a rapper and co-starred with him in the variety show 潮流合伙人 (FOURTRY) within the China's video streaming service iQIYI last year. In October, he released the download single "Go The Distance". There are both Japanese and Chinese versions of the song, and the Chinese version became the campaign theme song for the mobile game Hidden World Records, created by China's largest game company NetEase. MVs of each version were made to commemorate this collaboration and he became an anime character in them. Meanwhile, he appeared in the TV series Dangerous Venus. In December, he held his first live stream concert entitled Plan B, which was distributed to the whole world. Prior to the concert, he released the download single "Follow Me".

Fujioka appeared in the TV series Reach Beyond the Blue Sky, which aired from February 2021, and it was his first appearance in the taiga drama. He played Godai Tomoatsu in the asadora Here Comes Asa!, which aired on the same TV station from 2015 to 2016, and he played the same role again. In March, he released his single "Take Over". In April, he published his picture book FamBam named after his fan club. Furthermore, he also launched the "DEAN FUJIOKA Picture Book Donation Journey #SavewithFamBam", a support project that began with his desire to "create a colorful future with children through picture books", and sought support for this project through crowdfunding until March 31, 2021. The money raised, together with a portion of the proceeds from the picture book, will be used to provide learning opportunities for children in Japan and Asia, in cooperation with the INGO Save the Children. In June, he published his first photo book Z-Ero. From July, he appeared in the TV series My Fair Prince. Meanwhile, he held his live tour entitled Musical Transmute, from September to December. In November, he became the first Japanese ambassador for the men's category of the fashion brand COACH. In December, the animated film Hula Fulla Dance, his first challenge to a voice actor, was released. In the same month, he released his third album Transmute.

In January 2022, Fujioka starred in the film Pure Japanese. He also created and produced it. In March, he appeared as Mori Arinori in the TV movie Tsuda Umeko: Osatsu ni Natta Ryūgakusei. From April, he starred in the TV series Pandora's fruit Season 1. He also sang its theme song "Apple". Furthermore, in May and June, a two-part sequel to the 2017 live-action film Fullmetal Alchemist in which he appeared were released. In June, the film The Hound of the Baskervilles: Sherlock the Movie, a sequel to the TV series in which he starred in 2019, was also released. In July, he released his single "Apple". This includes the song "Be Alive", which was released for distribution in June and became the theme song for Identity V Japan League. From September, he starred in the TV series HOTEL -NEXT DOOR-. Meanwhile, he co-developed a yokan with the confectionery manufacturing and sales company Taneya, which he marketed under the name "Dean Fuji Yokan." The coffee sauce for the yokan is made from coffee from Gayo District, Aceh, Indonesia. A portion of the purchase price of the coffee will be used to support the activities of the Sumatran Orangutan Conservation Programme through The Orang Utan Regenwald GmbH. This project aims to protect the environment of the forests where endangered orangutans live and to enrich the lives of local producers. In November, he took part in the charity event Act Against Anything VOL.2 "THE VARIETY 28" by Goro Kishitani and Yasufumi Terawaki. In December, he appeared as a guest at the opening ceremony of the event Identity V Japan League Fall The Play Offs & X'mas Fan Meeting "Christmas Night ni Kane ga Naru".

From January 2023, Fujioka appeared in the TV series Hoshi Furu Yoru ni. From April, he's going to appear as Tengu / Sakamoto Ryōma in the Japanese morning drama series Ranman.

Filmography

Film
 August Story (2006, Hong Kong, Japan and Taiwan) as Ping-on
 Breeze of July (2007, Hong Kong) as Michito
 Summer's Tail (2007, Taiwan) as Akira Fuwa
 Warriors of the Rainbow: Seediq Bale (2011, Taiwan) as Miyakawa, the signaller
 Road Less Traveled (2011, Taiwan) as Yi
 Black & White Episode I: The Dawn of Assault (2012, Taiwan) as Agent Lee (Agent Li)
 I am Ichihashi: Journal of a Murderer (2013, Japan) as Tatsuya Ichihashi
 Dance! Dance! Dance! (2014/2015, Belgium and Japan) as Furu
 Shanti Days: 365-nichi, Shiawase na Kokyū (2014, Japan) as Atsushi Narayama
 Ninja The Monster (2015, Japan) as Denzō
 Go! Crazy Gangster (2016, Taiwan) Tseng, Shuai-nan (Zēng Shuàinán)
 Kekkon (Marriage) (2017, Japan) as Kenji Urumi
 Hagane no Renkinjutsushi (Fullmetal Alchemist) (2017, Japan) as Colonel Roy Mustang, The Flame Alchemist
 Sakamichi no Apollon (Kids on the Slope) (2018, Japan) as Junichi Katsuragi
 Umi wo Kakeru (The Man from the Sea) (2018, Japan, France and Indonesia) as Laut
 Sora-tobu Taiya (Recall) (2018, Japan) as Yūta Sawada
 Kioku ni Gozaimasen (Hit Me Anyone One More Time) (2019, Japan) as Isaka, the Executive Secretary to the Prime Minister
 Angel Sign (2019, Japan) as Takaya
 Pure Japanese (2022, Japan) as Daisuke Tateishi (also creator and producer)
 Hagane no Renkinjutsushi: Kanketsu-hen - Fukushūsha Scar (Fullmetal Alchemist The Revenge of Scar) (2022, Japan) as Colonel Roy Mustang
 The Hound of the Baskervilles: Sherlock the Movie (2022, Japan) as Shishio Homare
 Hagane no Renkinjutsushi: Kanketsu-hen - Saigo no Rensei (Fullmetal Alchemist The Final Alchemy) (2022, Japan) as Colonel Roy Mustang

Television
 Goku Dō High School (School Royale) (2006, Taiwan) – Dean Shindō
 Corner With Love (2007, Taiwan) – Kaede Andō
 Miss No Good (2008, Taiwan) – Chia, Sze-le (Jiǎ Sīlè)
 Just You (2013, Taiwan) – Dean Kamiya
 Gekitsui San-nin no Pilot (Shooting Down – Three Pilots) (2014, Japan) – Yue, Yi-chin (Yuè Yǐqín)
 The Pinkertons (2014–2015, Canada) – Kenji Harada
 Tantei no Tantei (Detective versus Detectives) (2015, Japan) – Sōta Kirishima
 Asa ga Kita (Here Comes Asa!) (2015–2016, Japan) – Godai Tomoatsu
 Dame na Watashi ni Koishite Kudasai (Please Love the Useless Me) (2016, Japan) – Ayumu Kurosawa
 Kensō no Machi, Shizuka na Umi (The Noisy Street, The Silent Sea) (2016, Japan) – Shin Minazuki
 IQ246: Kareinaru Jikenbo (IQ246: The Cases of a Royal Genius) (2016, Japan) – Kensei
 Moribito II: Guardian of the Spirit (2017, Japan) – Ehang
 Imakara Anata wo Kyōhaku Shimasu (May I blackmail you?) (2017, Japan) – Kanji Senkawa
 Totto-chan! ep. 38 (2017, Japan) – Hiroshi Kawake
 Monte-Cristo Haku: Kareinaru Fukushū (The Count of Monte-Cristo: Great Revenge) (2018, Japan) – Dan Saimon, Monte-Cristo Shinkai
 Les Misérables: Owarinaki Tabiji (2019, Japan) – Jun Baba
 Sherlock: Untold Stories (2019, Japan) – Shishio Homare
 Kiken na Venus (Dangerous Venus) (2020, Japan) – Yūma Yagami
 Seiten wo Tsuke (Reach Beyond the Blue Sky) (2021, Japan) – Godai Tomoatsu
Oshi no Ōjisama (My Fair Prince) (2021, Japan) – Tomohisa Mitsui
Tsuda Umeko: Osatsu ni Natta Ryūgakusei (2022, Japan) – Mori Arinori
Pandora no Kajitsu: Kagaku Hanzai Sōsa File Season1 (Pandora's fruit) (2022, Japan) – Yūichi Kohiruimaki
HOTEL -NEXT DOOR- (2022, Japan) – Katsuaki Saegusa
Hoshi Furu Yoru ni (2023, Japan) – Shinya Sasaki
Ranman (2023, Japan) – Tengu / Sakamoto Ryōma

Web series
 Happy Marriage!? (2016, Japan) – Hokuto Mamiya
 Boku no Oshi wa Ōjisama (My best is Fair Prince) ep. 8 (2021, Japan) – Tomohisa Mitsui
 Pandora no Kajitsu: Kagaku Hanzai Sōsa File Season2 (Pandora's fruit) (2022, Japan) – Yūichi Kohiruimaki

Anime film
 Hula Fulla Dance (2021, Japan) – Ryōta Suzukake
 The short anime Kamiusagi Ropé on Mezamashi TV (ep. "Hula Dance") (2021, Japan) – Ryōta Suzukake

Short film
 2 Cartons of Alphabet H (2006, Hong Kong), directed by Yan Yan Mak
 So Poetic (2007, Hong Kong), directed by Yan Yan Mak
 Sleeping Princess (2007, Hong Kong), starring with Denise Ho in Small Matters Music Video Story
 Sleeping Prince (2007, Hong Kong), starring with Denise Ho in Small Matters Music Video Story

Music videos (sung by others) 
For the music videos sung by DEAN FUJIOKA himself, see Music videos in the Discography.
 "Rolls Royce" by Denise Ho (2005, Hong Kong), directed by Yan Yan Mak
 "Echoes of Eternity" by Steven Lin (2007, Taiwan), directed by Jimmy Hung
 "Sleeping Prince" by Denise Ho (2007, Hong Kong), directed by Yan Yan Mak
 "This is Love" by Cyndi Wang (2007, Taiwan), directed by JP Huang
 "Ai Ya" by Vanness Wu (2011, Taiwan), directed by Chen Wei-ling

Discography

Singles
 "History Maker at InterCycle" (2016)
 "Echo" (2018)
"Take Over" (2021)
"Apple" (2022)

Digital downloads
Songs not included on the CD and songs that were distributed before the CD was released are listed.
 "My Dimension" (2013), MV directed by DEAN FUJIOKA
 "Midnight Messenger mabanua Remix" (2016)
 "History Maker" (2016), the opening theme song of the anime Yuri!!! on Ice
 "History Maker TJO Remix" (2016)
 "Midnight Messenger Mandarin Ver." (2017)
 "Let it snow! YUC'e Remix" (2018)
 "Let it snow! Mandarin Ver." (2018)
 "Maybe Tomorrow" (2019)
 "Shelly" (2019)
 "Send It Away (feat. GONG)" (2019)
 "Searching For The Ghost" (2019)
 "Neo Dimension" (2020)
 "东京游 (Tokyo Trip)" (2020), sung by DEAN FUJIOKA & 福克斯
 "Go The Distance" (2020)
 "Follow Me" (2020)
 "Plan B" (2021)
 "Runaway" (2021)
 "Sukima" (2021)
 "Apple" (Pandora Ver.) (2022)
 "Be Alive" (2022)
 "Apple" (2022)

EPs
 Permanent Vacation / Unchained Melody (2017)
 Let it snow! (2017)
 Shelly (2019)

Studio albums
 Cycle (2016)
 History in the Making (2019)
 Transmute (2021)The 12-track digital album Transmute (Trinity) was pre-released on October 29, 2021. The 22-track playlist album Musical Transmute was released digitally on December 27, 2021.

Live album 
 DEAN FUJIOKA Special Live "InterCycle 2016" at Osaka-Jo Hall (2017, Japan)

Music videos

Others
 "Jídào Zhànyì (Gokudō Battle)" in the Goku Dō High School Original TV Soundtrack (2006). Singers: Kingone Wang, Li Wei Hao, Ma Ju Long, and DEAN FUJIOKA (beat box and rap).
 "Hello Radio" (2016), the limited-time rental song for the spring campaign ACCESS! by Japan FM League and TSUTAYA. Musicians: The Poolside, including Shigeru Kishida, tofubeats, Takuya Ōhashi, Kaela Kimura, KREVA, DEAN FUJIOKA, Sakura Fujiwara, and YONCE.

Live performances

Festival and events
 High Jinks by CHAPTER47 (2014)
 LIVE@Makitasports (2016)
 MTV VMAJ 2018 -THE LIVE- (2018)
 ☆Taku Takahashi presents Intergalactic -"History In The Making" Party- (2019) as a DJ
 908 FESTIVAL 2019 (2019)
 Act Against Anything VOL.2 "THE VARIETY 28" (2022)
 Identity V Japan League Fall The Play Offs & X'mas Fan Meeting "Christmas Night ni Kane ga Naru" (2022)

News programs
 Saturday Station (TV Asahi), an irregular appearance as an influencer from 22 April 2017 to 26 September 2020

Radio
 Asian! Plus α Dean Tatsunami RADIO (Nippon Cultural Broadcasting), a digital radio program from 9 February 2007 to 28 March 2008
 DEAN FUJIOKA's Ch-Ch-Ch-Check it Out!!! in SUNDAY MARK'E 765 (FM COCOLO), a regular segment from 3 April 2016 to 25 March 2018
 DEAN FUJIOKA･Produce･Super･Edition (JAPAN FM NETWORK COMPANY), a program for a limited time during January 2019 and December 2021
 ROPPONGI PASSION PIT (J-WAVE), a regular program from 4 April 2020 to 26 March 2022, with Yūki Mihara
 From 4 April 2021 to 27 March 2022, its program was also aired on FM802.

Books and serializations
 Tatsumaki Photoessay

Picture book
 FamBam, illustrated by Hikarin (April 9, 2021)

Photo book
 Z-Ero, photographed by RK (June 30, 2021)

Serialization
 Have a nice Dean!! (December 2016 to October 2017 issues of UOMO, published by Shueisha)
 Shūkan Entame "STORY" (every Saturday in December 2021, morning edition of the Yomiuri Shimbun)

Others
 Animated documentary
 Mirai eno Tegami〜Kono Michi no Tochū kara〜 (2016, YouTube PrefFukushima) as a story teller
 Mirai eno Tegami〜Kono Michi no Tochū kara〜, Jūittūme no Tegami: Kumo no Kanata (2017, YouTube PrefFukushima) as a story teller
 Amuse Mobile art project "Shirotoiro"
 不変 (Fuhen) (2016), collaborated with Hina Sakurada
 The 150th Anniversary of Beatrix Potter's Birth: Peter Rabbit Exhibition (2016 - 2017, Tokyo, Fukuoka, Sendai, Osaka, Hiroshima and Nagoya) as an official supporter and an audio guide navigator
 Dean Fujioka Hatsu no Igirisu Tabi: Utsukushiki Kosui Chihō, Peter Rabbit no Sekai wo Tazuneru (2016, BS Asahi)
 NHK Special: Kanzen Kaibō Tyrannosaurus〜Saikyō Kyōryū Shinka no Nazo〜 (2016, NHK) as a navigator
 Bubble tea "Dean Tapioca" (2019, taiwan ten cafe) as the supervisor of the drink
 Weibo Account Festival in Japan 2019 (2019, Tokyo) as a master of ceremonies
 Charity goods project for medical support of COVID-19 "AMUSE HEART FES. in A!SMART" (2020), agreed with the purpose and participated
 World Robot Summit 2020
 Opening Ceremony of WRS in Aichi (2021, Aichi Sky Expo) as an ambassador
 Opening Ceremony of WRS in Fukushima (2021, Robot Test Field located in Fukushima Prefecture) as an ambassador
Coach (2021 - ) as an ambassador for the men's category
 Epson "ORIENT STAR" (2021 -, China) as an ambassador
 Japan Exchange Group "Dainōkai" (The final session of the year) (2021, Osaka Exchange) as a guest
 SNOOPY HAPPINESS FLOAT 2022: Departure Ceremony PR Event (2022, in front of Tokyo Tower) as a special guest
 BMW THE SEVEN ART MUSEUM (2022, The National Art Center, Tokyo) as a guest
 Ribbon-cutting ceremony at LANVIN GINZA STORE (2022, Ginza) as a special guest
 FWD Life Insurance Company, Limited (2022 - , Japan) as an ambassador

Awards and nominations

References and notes

External links
  
 Official agency profile 
 

1980 births
Living people
Amuse Inc. talents
A-Sketch artists
Actors from Chiba Prefecture
Actors from Fukushima Prefecture
Japanese male film actors
Japanese male television actors
21st-century Japanese male actors
Models from Fukushima Prefecture
Japanese male models
21st-century Japanese singers
21st-century Japanese male singers
Japanese male singer-songwriters
Japanese singer-songwriters
Musicians from Fukushima Prefecture
Japanese male musicians
Japanese film directors
People from Sukagawa
Japanese expatriates in Taiwan